Where the Breakers Roar is a 1908 American silent short drama film directed by D. W. Griffith. A print of the film exists in the film archive of the Library of Congress.

Cast
 Arthur V. Johnson as Tom Hudson
 Linda Arvidson as Alice Fairchild
 Charles Inslee as The Villain
 Edward Dillon as Policeman
 George Gebhardt as At the Beach / Assaulted Man
 Robert Harron as On Boardwalk
 Guy Hedlund
 Florence Lawrence as At the Beach
 Marion Leonard
 Mack Sennett as Policeman
 Harry Solter as At the Beach

References

External links
 

1908 films
1908 drama films
1908 short films
Silent American drama films
American silent short films
American black-and-white films
Films directed by D. W. Griffith
Films with screenplays by Stanner E.V. Taylor
Films with screenplays by D. W. Griffith
Surviving American silent films
1900s American films
American drama short films